A quench, in materials science, is a rapid cooling.

Quench or quenching may also refer to:

Science and technology
 Quenching (astronomy), a process in which a galaxy loses cold gas ending star formation
 Quenching (fluorescence), any process which decreases the fluorescence intensity of a given substance
 Quenching (scrubber), a type of pollution scrubber
 Magnet quench, a loss of superconductivity resulting in a rapid rise of resistance and temperature, such as in a superconducting magnet
 Dark quencher, a dye that absorbs light, but does not emit it, used in molecular biology
 the means by which a Geiger-Müller tube is able to distinguish individual particles
 in a super-regenerative receiver, the process of interrupting the main RF oscillation with a lower frequency oscillation
 the process of stopping an electrical arc, for example in a fuse or Spark-gap transmitter
 in an internal combustion engine, the rapid cooling of fuel inside the combustion chamber that prevents it from burning
 rapid evaporative cooling of a gas by injection of a liquid
 a secondary gas in a neon tube filled with a Penning mixture

Other uses
 Quench (album), by the Beautiful South, 1998
 Quench (band), a British rock band
 Quench (company), an American water-cooler company
 Quench (musician), Australian dance music producer
 Quench, a magazine published by gair rhydd, a student newspaper of Cardiff University
 Quench, a program on the Food Network
 Quench, a Zimbabwean soft drink

See also
 ICMP Source Quench, a message that is part of the internet core protocol
 Lily Quench, a series of children's books